Herbert Honz (born 6 September 1942) is a former German cyclist. He competed in the 1000m time trial at the 1968 Summer Olympics.

References

External links
 

1942 births
Living people
German male cyclists
Olympic cyclists of West Germany
Cyclists at the 1968 Summer Olympics
Cyclists from Baden-Württemberg
People from Reutlingen (district)
Sportspeople from Tübingen (region)